Robert V may refer to:

 Robert V, Count of Dreux
 Robert de Brus, 5th Lord of Annandale